HomeOS is the working title of a home automation operating system that was being developed at Microsoft Research in the early 2010s. Microsoft Research announced the project in 2010.

HomeOS communicates with Lab of Things, a cloud-based Internet of Things infrastructure also developed by Microsoft.

The slogan for the HomeOS project is "Enabling smarter homes for everyone."

The HomeOS development team has written three sample applications that make use of multiple devices, including a "sticky media" app that plays music in parts of the house that are lit up, but not other rooms; a two-factor authentication app that uses audio from smartphones and images from a front-door camera to turn on lights when a user is identified; and a home browser for viewing and controlling a user's access to all devices in a home.

Some staff who worked on the HomeOS project cited Microsoft CEO Steve Ballmer's focus on enterprise applications,  productivity software, and cloud computing as the reason for the stalled development of HomeOS.

See also
Building automation
Home server
Lighting control system
LinuxMCE

References

External links 

 Official HomeOS website

External links
 Lab of Things

Internet of things
Home automation
Microsoft operating systems
Microsoft Research